The Journal of Epidemiology and Biostatistics is a peer reviewed journal for epidemiological and biostatistical studies. It is published by Martin Dunitz Ltd, part of Taylor & Francis Group. It covers Biology, Mathematics and Statistics and Public Health. In 2002 the title was changed to Journal of Cancer Epidemiology and Prevention.

References

Epidemiology journals